Saint-Pierre-de-Fursac (Limousin: Furçac (Sent Peir)) is a former commune in the Creuse department in central France. On 1 January 2017, it was merged into the new commune Fursac.

The Château de Chabannes was an orphanage in the village of Chabannes (part of today's Saint-Pierre-de-Fursac) in Vichy France where about 400 Jewish refugee children were saved from the Holocaust by the efforts of its director, Félix Chevrier and other teachers.

Geography
The river Semme forms part of the commune's northeastern border, flows west through the commune, then forms part of the commune's northwestern border.

Population

See also
Communes of the Creuse department

References

Former communes of Creuse
Populated places disestablished in 2017